Skid Proof is a 1923 silent film drama directed by Scott R. Dunlap and starring Buck Jones, billed as Charles Jones. It was produced and released by Fox Film Corporation.

It is a surviving film in the Museum of Modern Art collection.

Cast
Buck Jones - Jack Darwin
Laura Anson - Nadine
Fred Eric - Dutton Hardmere
Jacqueline Gadsden - Lorraine Hardmere
Peggy Shaw - Marie Hardmere
Earl Metcalfe - Rufus Tyler (*as Earl Metcalf)
Claude Payton - Masters (*as Claude Peyton)
Harry Tracy - Dancing Joe (*as Harry Tracey)

See also
List of Fox Film films

References

External links

1923 films
American silent feature films
Fox Film films
Films directed by Scott R. Dunlap
American black-and-white films
Silent American drama films
1923 drama films
1920s American films